Guan Zhe (born 23 April 1981), Also known as Grady Guan is a Chinese pop singer and songwriter. He was a contestant on The Voice of China, which featured Liu Huan, Na Ying, Yang Kun and Harlem Yu as judges. In January 2016, he has been selected to be a season 4 contestant on I Am a Singer.

Career 
Guan Was born in 1981 in Jilin in a working-class family. He started feeling interest in music from his early childhood although he would pursue other goals before entering in the music industry. In 2002, after getting a computer programming degree in the Yanshan University, he started taking the option of starting a musical career seriously.

In 2005 started the talent show boom in China with many popular singing programmes filling the airwaves. He decided to take part in "A Type Show" which was broadcast by the Shanghai based Dragon TV. Unexpectedly, he won the contest and signed a contract with the Chinese branch of Avex Trax. After that, he was awarded in the Young Singers Grand Prix, a show which is organised every two years by CCTV.

In 2007 Guan started composing music for other Mainland Chinese singers such as Sun Yue, Na Ying and Mao Ning amongst others. Then, with his record company he started recording his first studio album entitled "Carefully" which was released in 2008. Soon after the release of his album, he composed a song that was included in the music compilation of the Beijing 2008 Summer Olympic Games.

After releasing his second studio album entitled "Forever" in 2009, he performed, one year later, in the Shanghai World Expo 2010 opening ceremony with the top finalists of the Super Boy Contest.

In 2011, to keep on boosting his career, Guan Zhe took part in the Chinese Million Star show in Taiwan. However, his breakthrough came in 2012 when he took part in the Voice of China. Thanks to his participation in that contest, his popularity experienced a rise and he released his third album which had the title of "Surrounding Story".

In 2014 he signed a contract with the Chinese branch of Warner Music, where he would record his following releases.

Discography

Studio albums 
 Carefully (2008)
 Forever (2009)
 Surrounding story (2012)
 Lonely (2014)
 Enough (2017)
Mr Hat (2018)

Non album singles 
 Drive your melancholy (2008) Used as a theme song in the homonymous drama.
 Light in the rainbow (2009)
 Great life (2009)
 Giving you a song (2010)
 Smile Shanghai (2010) Performed in the Expo 2010 opening ceremony with the Super Boy finalists.
 Friend (2011)
 Stablish yourself (2013)
 Bored (2013)

Songs for other artists 
Sun Yue
 I love you carelessly
 Love
 Supermom
 Moved
 A love song in my memory
 Further away from you
 With You
 Congratulations
Mao Ning
 Jade dress
 Give love
 Countdown
 To listen stealthily
 Come on now
 I miss you everyday
 Perfect man
 Did you return home?
Chu Xupeng
 My love
 Birthday present
 I can't listen to your love words

References

1981 births
Living people
Chinese Mandopop singers
Mandopop singer-songwriters
People from Jilin City
Singers from Jilin
The Voice of China contestants
21st-century Chinese male singers
Manchu singers